The Johnstown Riverhawks was a professional indoor American football team based out of Johnstown, Pennsylvania.  They were a charter member of the American Indoor Football Association (AIFA).  They played their home games at Cambria County War Memorial Arena.

History

Indoor Football League (1999–2000)

The Riverhawks began play in 1999 as the Topeka Knights of the original Indoor Football League.  They missed the playoffs in their inaugural season, finishing third in the Northern Division at 6-6.  During the second season, the team changed ownership and became the Topeka Kings.  The team finished with a much better record, going 10-4 and winning the Western Conference, Southern Division championship.  In the playoffs, they defeated the Black Hills Machine in the quarterfinal round before losing to the Bismarck Blaze in the semifinals.

Move to Tennessee (2001–2003)
After the season, they moved to Knoxville, Tennessee became the Tennessee ThunderCats, and moved to the Indoor Professional Football League. They would impressively win the league championship in their first year.  After the IPFL folded, the ThunderCats moved to the NIFL. During their tenure in the league, they had decent success in 2002, but considerably less success as the Tennessee Riverhawks in 2003.

Beyond
In 2004, while they were the Greenville Riverhawks, their ownership folded after three games. The team itself moved to Lancaster, Pennsylvania and played their remaining games. Then, they were re-founded by Andrew Haines, owner of the Atlantic Indoor Football League. The team was purchased by Brian Schwelling of Atlanta, Georgia in February 2005. Schwelling operated the team successfully until September of that same year when it was sold to Michael Dawson. Schwelling was successful in bringing the Riverhawks to the semifinal game in the team's inaugural season.

On March 4, 2006, the Riverhawks won their first game of their second season on the road 21-14 against the Steubenville Stampede, which made AIFL history by becoming the lowest scoring game in the league's then-two year existence.

On March 26, 2006, the Riverhawks lost the AIFL's very first overtime game 41-38 against the Reading Express at home.

In the 2008 season, the Riverhawks ended their contract with the Johnstown War Memorial.

AIFL owner Andrew Haines announced he was relaunching the defunct AIFL as the Ultimate Indoor Football League in the 2011 season (the AIFA is technically a separate league with different owners founded to avoid Haines's legal troubles), and would be bringing back Johnstown in the process. The revived team was to bear the name "Johnstown Generals."

2001 Tennessee ThunderCats IPFL Schedule 
Week 1 – Tennessee ThunderCats 52, Trenton Lightning 25

Week 2 – Tennessee ThunderCats 34, St. Louis Renegades 28

Week 3 – Tennessee ThunderCats 42, Boise Stallions 29

Week 4 – bye

Week 5 – Tennessee ThunderCats 39, Trenton Lightning 26

Week 6 – Tennessee ThunderCats 41, Trenton Lightning 24

Week 7 – Tennessee ThunderCats 40, St. Louis Renegades 23

Week 8 – Omaha Beef 72, Tennessee ThunderCats 50

Week 9 – Tennessee ThunderCats 47, St. Louis Renegades 44

Week 10 – Omaha Beef 56, Tennessee ThunderCats 29

Week 11 – Omaha Beef 54, Tennessee ThunderCats 32

Week 12 – Boise Stallions 40, Tennessee ThunderCats 38

Week 13 – Tennessee ThunderCats 61, Omaha Beef 34

Week 14 – Tennessee ThunderCats 35, St. Louis Renegades 10

Week 15 – bye

Week 16 – Tennessee ThunderCats 53, Boise Stallions 9

Week 17 – bye

Week 18 – Tennessee ThunderCats vs. Boise Stallions – Cancelled

Week 19 – Tennessee ThunderCats 43, St. Louis Renegades 27

IPFL Championship – Tennessee ThunderCats 47, Omaha Beef 38

Season-by-season 

|-
| colspan="6" align="center" | Topeka Knights (IFL)
|-
|1999 || 6 || 6 || 0 || 3rd Northern || --
|-
| colspan="6" align="center" | Topeka Knights/Kings (IFL)
|-
|2000 || 10 || 4 || 0 || 1st WC Southern || Won Quarterfinal (B.H. Machine)Lost Semifinal (Bismarck)
|-
| colspan="6" align="center" | Tennessee ThunderCats (IPFL)
|-
|2001 || 11 || 4 || 0 || 2nd League || Won IPFL Championship (Omaha)
|-
| colspan="6" align="center" | Tennessee ThunderCats (NIFL)
|-
|2002 || 10 || 4 || 0 || 2nd AC Northern || Won Round 1 (Lake Charles)Lost AC Quarterfinal (Ohio Valley)
|-
| colspan="6" align="center" | Tennessee Riverhawks (NIFL)
|-
|2003 || 6 || 8 || 0 || 5th AC Eastern || --
|-
| colspan="6" align="center" | Greenville Riverhawks (NIFL)
|-
|2004 || 0 || 4 || 0 || 5th AC Eastern || --
|-
| colspan="6" align="center" | Johnstown Riverhawks (AIFL)
|-
|2005 || 6 || 4 || 0 || 3rd League || Lost League Semifinals (Richmond)
|-
|2006 || 8 || 5 || 0 || 5th Northern || --
|-
| colspan="6" align="center" | Johnstown Riverhawks (AIFA)
|-
|2007 || 6 || 9 || 0 || 5th Northern || --
|-
|2008 || rowspan="1" colspan="5" style="text-align: center;" valign="middle" |Did Not Play
|-
!Totals || 66 || 51 || 0
|colspan="2"| (including playoffs)

2007 Season Schedule

References

External links
 Official Site of the Johnstown Riverhawks
 Riverhawks' 2005 Stats
 Riverhawks' 2006 Season & Results
 Riverhawks' 2007 Stats

American Indoor Football Association teams
American Indoor Football League teams
Johnstown, Pennsylvania
Defunct American football teams in Pennsylvania
2005 establishments in Pennsylvania
2008 disestablishments in Pennsylvania
American football teams established in 2005
American football teams disestablished in 2008